Paklíč  is a 1944 Czechoslovak criminal comedy film, directed by Miroslav Cikán. It stars Oldřich Nový, Jiřina Steimarová, Josef Kemr and Jaroslav Marvan.

References

External links
Paklíč  at the Internet Movie Database

1944 films
Czech crime comedy films
Films directed by Miroslav Cikán
1940s crime comedy films
Czechoslovak crime comedy films
Czechoslovak black-and-white films
1944 comedy films
1940s Czech films